A Matter of Life and Death is a novel by Andrey Kurkov. Originally published in 1996 in Russian, it was translated and published in English in 2005.

External links
 Review in The Guardian, March 2005

References

Novels by Andrey Kurkov
1996 novels